Computer Peripherals, Inc. (CPI) was an American manufacturer of computer printers, based in Rochester, Michigan.

CPI's precursor, Holley Computer Products, was formed as a joint venture between Control Data Corporation (CDC) and the Holley Carburetor Company in April 1962. Holley developed and produced a series of drum printers. In June 1964, CDC bought out Holley and partnered with NCR and ICL to form CPI in Rochester.

In the early 1970s CPI also had a branch in Valley Forge, Pennsylvania. This division made punched card readers and 9-track magnetic tape drives for both parent companies (CDC and NCR).

In 1978 CDC bought controlling interest of CPI. CPI produced several train printers under the CDC and Fastrain brands, including the CDC Model 512 (1967), the Fastrain A 1200 LPM (1969) and the Fastrain 9372-III 2000 LPM (1976).

In 1977, CPI began manufacturing printers at a factory in Stevenage, Herts, UK that was originally used for the manufacture of ICL1900 computers. By 1979, the factory also made 9-track tape drives which were used in ICL and CDC computers, and were sold with industry-standard interfaces for use with other manufacturer's computers.

In 1982, CDC acquired a controlling interest in Centronics in exchange for CPI and $25 million in cash. CPI was merged into Centronics and eventually the Rochester facility was closed.

References

1964 establishments in Michigan
1982 disestablishments in Michigan
American companies established in 1964
American companies disestablished in 1982
Companies based in Oakland County, Michigan
Computer companies established in 1964
Computer companies disestablished in 1982
Computer printer companies
Control Data Corporation
Defunct companies based in Michigan
Defunct computer companies of the United States
Electronics companies established in 1964
Electronics companies disestablished in 1982